Diana Baig (born 15 October 1995) is a Pakistani cricketer and footballer. In cricket, she plays primarily as a right-arm medium-fast bowler. Baig was included in Pakistan squad for the 2013 Women's Cricket World Cup and 2016 ICC Women's World Twenty20.

Early life and education 
Diana Baig was born in Hunza, Gilgit Baltistan. Her interest in sports started with street cricket and football. Learned and enthusiastic, she moved to Lahore, for her intermediate and undergraduate studies. She opted for Lahore College for Women University, where her endeavors were rewarded by the college. Her multi-talented sporting side gives her the edge, as she can represent her country at international level for both, football and cricket. She is fluent in English, Urdu and Burushaski.

Career

Football
Baig began in football by chance. She was selected for the domestic football team when there was a shortage of players.

Cricket
Baig started her career in 2010, leading the Gilgit-Baltistan women's cricket team. She was selected for Pakistan's A team in 2012 and for the squad of the full national team in 2013.

She made her international cricket debut in 2015 against Bangladesh.

Her bowling and fielding performance in the ODI against India in 2017 Women's Cricket World Cup was impressive and was praised by Ian Bishop, one of the commentators. She came into the team in place of Kainat Imtiaz, and she immediately made an impact by taking an important wicket, Smriti Mandhana with an inswinger. 

In October 2018, she was named in Pakistan's squad for the 2018 ICC Women's World Twenty20 tournament in the West Indies. In January 2020, she was named in Pakistan's squad for the 2020 ICC Women's T20 World Cup in Australia. In October 2021, she was named in Pakistan's team for the 2021 Women's Cricket World Cup Qualifier tournament in Zimbabwe. In January 2022, she was named in Pakistan's team for the 2022 Women's Cricket World Cup in New Zealand. In May 2022, she was named in Pakistan's team for the cricket tournament at the 2022 Commonwealth Games in Birmingham, England.

References

External links
 
 

Baig, Diana
Baig, Diana
People from Gilgit
Pakistani women cricketers
Pakistan women One Day International cricketers
Pakistan women Twenty20 International cricketers
Islamabad women cricketers
Federal Capital women cricketers
Saif Sports Saga women cricketers
Zarai Taraqiati Bank Limited women cricketers
Higher Education Commission women cricketers
Pakistani women's footballers
Pakistan women's international footballers
Women's association footballers not categorized by position
Cricketers at the 2022 Commonwealth Games
Commonwealth Games competitors for Pakistan